The 2003 Buffalo Bulls football team represented the University at Buffalo in the 2003 NCAA Division I-A football season. The Bulls offense scored 177 points while the defense allowed 445 points.

Schedule

Roster

References

Buffalo
Buffalo Bulls football seasons
Buffalo Bulls football